Ligomarc Advocates, also Ligomarc, is a Ugandan law firm headquartered in Kampala, the capital city of Uganda. It is a private legal practice, founded in 2003. The firm specializes in business law.

Location
The offices of the law firm are located on the 5th Floor of the Western Wing, at Social Security House, Plot 4 Jinja Road, in the central business district of Kampala, Uganda's capital city.

Overview
Ligomarc Advocates is a corporate and financial law firm. It has four partners; 1. Ruth Sebatindira, the founder of the firm 2. Kabiito Karamagi is the managing partner 3. Joshua Ogwal and 4. Olivia Matovu. At one time, the firm employed a total of 21 attorneys. The law firm handles a whole range of legal matters, with focus on Banking Law, Tax Law, Transaction Advisory, Commercial Litigation, Trade Marks and Insolvency.

History
In 2003, Sebatindira founded Ligomarc Advocates, as a solo practice. In 2006, Kabiito Karamagi joined the firm, which then transformed into a partnership. Joshua Ogwal joined the practice in 2011 and Olivia Kyarimpa Matovu came on board in 2015. As of August 2020, the firm has four partners, 18 lawyers and a total number of employees of 45.

Legal matters
The firm has in the past, and as of August 2020, is handling a host of financial and commercial legal matters, including business insolvencies, lease finance transactions, investment advisory, contract disputes, intellectual property, 
mergers and acquisitions, trademark infringements, and other related matters. A partial list of past and ongoing engagements by the firm is displayed on the page of this reference.

In January 2020, Justice Lydia Mugambe of the Civil Division of the High Court of Uganda appointed Ruth Sebatindira, the founding partner of Ligomarc Advocates as the Administrator of Uganda Telecom Limited, a parastatal company in court-appointed receivership since April 2017. Sebatindira took over the administration of UTL from Bemanya Twebaze on 6 January 2020..

Affiliations
In December 2017, Ligomarc Advocates established a collaborative relationship with Andersen Global, a network of independent legal and tax professionals, numbering over 2,500 in more than 78 locations worldwide, as of December 2017.

See also
 Law Development Centre
 Uganda Law Society

References

External links
 Official Website

 

Law firms of Uganda
Kampala
Companies established in 2003
2003 establishments in Uganda